is a Japanese professional baseball Infielder for the Fukuoka SoftBank Hawks of Nippon Professional Baseball (NPB).

Professional career
On October 11, 2021, Nomura was drafted by the Fukuoka Softbank Hawks in the 2021 Nippon Professional Baseball draft. 

On March 25, 2022, Nomura made his first league debut in the Pacific League against the Hokkaido Nippon-Ham Fighters as a pinch runner.

On March 29 He recorded his first stolen base against the Chiba Lotte Marines On April 6, he played as a no.2 and left field against the Orix Buffaloes and recorded his first hit. He also recorded his first home run on April 21 against the Buffaloes. 

On August 21, Nomura hit two home runs against the Hokkaido Nippon-Ham Fighters, bringing his total to 10. It was the first time a rookie player had hit a 10 homers since Masataka Yoshida in 2016 and the first Hawks team record in 83 years, since Kazuto Tsuruoka did it in 1939. 

On October 2 against the Chiba Lotte Marines, he recorded 10 stole bases, becoming the first rookie player to hit a 10 home runs and a 10 stolen bases in the Pacific League in 37 years since  in 1985. 

In 2022 season, he finished the regular season with a .239 batting average, 10 home runs, 25 runs batted in, and 10 stolen bases in 97 games as a rookie player.

References

External links

 Career statistics - NPB.jp
 99 Isami Nomura PLAYERS2022 - Fukuoka SoftBank Hawks Official site

1996 births
Living people
Fukuoka SoftBank Hawks players
Japanese baseball players
Nippon Professional Baseball infielders
Baseball people from Hyōgo Prefecture
Baseball people from Kobe